Diocese of Birmingham may refer to:

In England and Wales:
 Anglican Diocese of Birmingham
 Coptic Orthodox Diocese of the Midlands and Affiliated Areas U.K., previously titled Diocese of Birmingham
 Roman Catholic Archdiocese of Birmingham, previously a Diocese until 1911

In the United States:
 Roman Catholic Diocese of Birmingham in Alabama